A New and Exact Map is the fourth album by SubArachnoid Space, released on October 15, 2000, through September Gurls.

Track listing

Personnel 
SubArachnoid Space
Chris Van Huffel – drums, percussion, synthesizer, sampler, slide guitar
Melynda Jackson – guitar, synthesizer, percussion
Mason Jones – guitar, synthesizer, percussion
Andey Koa Stephens – bass guitar, organ, synthesizer
Production and additional personnel
Doug Ferguson – organ on "Indy Maru"
Kime Joan – photography
SubArachnoid Space – design

References

External links 
 

2000 albums
SubArachnoid Space albums